Unlike the National Organic Program in the United States, there is no legal definition of the word "natural" for food and consumer products. The Food and Drug Administration continues to follow the policy it set in 1993: "FDA has not established a formal definition for the term 'natural', however the agency has not objected to the use of the term on food labels provided it is used in a manner that is truthful and not misleading and the product does not contain added color, artificial flavors, or synthetic substances. Use of the term 'natural' is not permitted in the ingredient list, with the exception of the phrase 'natural flavorings'."

Market
There is increasing consumer demand for natural and organic products, especially in the food, personal care and household categories. The nutrition industry continues to grow, reaching $117 billion in sales in 2010, an increase of 6 percent over 2009. The North American market for natural personal care products passed $5 billion for the first time in 2010, with revenues expected to reach $8 billion by 2017.
The cosmetics industry has expressed concerns about customer confusion regarding products marketed as natural. In addition, retailers are demanding more natural products for their store shelves. Many manufacturers are looking for standards and certification to support their natural claims, especially as natural and organic products are expected to achieve 10 percent market share in many product categories. The Natural Seal, launched by the Natural Products Association in 2008, is the most widely used natural certification for personal care products. NPA launched a certification for home care products in 2010.

Seal
The Natural Seal is described as the first and only natural certification in the U.S. Products certified by NPA must be at least 95 percent natural ingredients or ingredients from natural sources, excluding water. NPA-certified products use natural ingredients, avoid ingredients with health risks, don’t use animal testing, and include biodegradable or recycled material in the packaging. Products must list all ingredients on the package label. NPA also requires 100 percent natural fragrances and colorants. Certified products are said to appear in more than 85,000 stores nationwide. More than 1,100 products and ingredients have been certified.

In 2011, NSF International, a global public health and safety organization, and NATURE, the International Natural and Organic Cosmetics Association, announced a partnership to develop another standard for natural personal care products. "There is currently no regulatory, nor a globally recognized, definition for the term ‘natural'. The new NSF/NATRUE standard will define the use of the term ‘natural', helping to promote authentic and quality natural personal care products," said NSF International. NPA responded by saying, "A second seal with different standards does no service to natural products customers, retailers, or manufacturers."

See also
 Natural products

References

Product certification